Jarrell Independent School District is a public school district based in Jarrell, Texas (USA). 
The district has four campuses - Jarrell High (Grades 9–12), Jarrell Middle (Grades 6-8), Igo Elementary (Grades PK-5) and Jarrell Elementary (Grades PK-5).

History
After housing all students in the same school from its inception in 1916, 2007 saw the building of a new high school marking the first time in JISD history that more than one campus would be used to educate students. In 2010 a new elementary school was built and in 2014 the middle school received a new building as well. In August 2019 , Jarrell Independent School District opened a second elementary campus. Igo elementary school honors the Igos family killed in the 1997 Jarrell tornado. This explosive growth in only a 10-year period is mainly due to Jarrell's location off of Interstate Highway 35 in between Austin, Texas and Waco, Texas and also to the Sonterra subdivision of homes that has greatly increased the population.

The 1916 building, Jarrell's first schoolhouse is still in existence today though it is not used for any formal purposes in the district. It is housed in between the intermediate school and the new middle school.

Athletics
Jarrell's mascot is the Cougar.

The Jarrell basketball teams have been the most consistently successful sport for the high school. The boys' basketball team advanced to the 2-A state semi Finals and narrowly lost to Shallowater by one point in 2007. The girls' basketball team reached the class 3-A state semi Finals in 2015 and lost to Shallowater. The boys teams have also routinely been among the strongest teams in the state and have reached the state playoffs in recent years.

In 2012 the Jarrell Cougars baseball team were crowned State Champions for Class 2-A, which was Jarrell's first team championship in any sport.

Academics
Jarrell is routinely rated Academically Recognized by the state of Texas though at times, some campuses have been rated as merely Academically Acceptable.

Notable People 
Morgan Cooper, baseball pitcher - University of Texas. Drafted in the 2nd round of the 2017 MLB draft by the Los Angeles Dodgers.

Carla Juarez, pageant winner - Was crowned Miss Fiesta San Antonio 2018

External links
Jarrell Independent School District
Jarrell ISD (archive 2006)

School districts in Williamson County, Texas
1916 establishments in Texas